52266 Van Flandern, provisional designation , is a stony Phocaea asteroid from the inner regions of the asteroid belt, approximately 4 kilometers in diameter. It was discovered on 10 January 1986, by American astronomers Carolyn and Eugene Shoemaker at the Palomar Observatory in California, United States. The asteroid was later named for American astronomer Tom Van Flandern.

Orbit and classification 

Van Flandern is a member of the Phocaea family, a family of stony asteroids with similar orbital characteristics. It orbits the Sun in the inner main-belt at a distance of 1.8–2.8 AU once every 3 years and 7 months (1,303 days). Its orbit has an eccentricity of 0.22 and an inclination of 24° with respect to the ecliptic.

Physical characteristics 

Van Flandern has been characterized as a common S-type asteroid by Pan-STARRS photometric survey.

Lightcurves 

In January and February 2011, four rotational lightcurves of Van Flandern were obtained from photometric observations at the Via Capote Observatory , the Palomar Transient Factory, and the Australian Oakley Southern Sky Observatory, as well as by astronomer René Roy at his Blauvac Observatory in France. Lightcurve analysis gave a well-defined rotation period between 9.65 and 9.89 hours with a brightness variation between 0.52 and 0.61 magnitude.

Diameter and albedo 

According to the survey carried out by NASA's Wide-field Infrared Survey Explorer with its subsequent NEOWISE mission, Van Flandern measures 3.47 and 4.42 kilometers in diameter and its surface has an albedo of 0.30 and 0.249, respectively.

The Collaborative Asteroid Lightcurve Link assumes an albedo of 0.23 – derived from 25 Phocaea, the family's most massive member and namesake – and calculates a diameter of 4.6 kilometers with an absolute magnitude of 13.9.

Naming 

This minor planet was named in memory of American astronomer Tom Van Flandern (1940–2009), expert in lunar occultations and on the dynamics of binary minor planets at USNO in the 1970s.

Van Flandern also participated in the refinement of the Global Positioning System and published the Meta Research Bulletin for non-mainstream views on cosmology. The approved naming citation was published by the Minor Planet Center on 9 February 2009.

References

External links 
 Asteroid Lightcurve Database (LCDB), query form (info )
 Dictionary of Minor Planet Names, Google books
 Asteroids and comets rotation curves, CdR – Observatoire de Genève, Raoul Behrend
 Discovery Circumstances: Numbered Minor Planets (50001)-(55000) – Minor Planet Center
 
 

052266
Discoveries by Carolyn S. Shoemaker
Discoveries by Eugene Merle Shoemaker
Named minor planets
19860110